The 16349 / 16350 Rajya Rani Express is an Express  train belonging to Indian Railways Southern Railway zone that runs between  and  in India.This train is a part of Rajya Rani Express series from Kerala state.

It operates as train number 16349 from Kochuveli to Nilambur Road and as train number 16350 in the reverse direction, serving the state of Kerala.

Background
After inauguration the commuters were demanded to make Rajya Rani Express as an independent train.

Coaches
The 16349 / 50 Rajya Rani Express has a total of 13 coaches which includes two AC 2 Tier, one AC 3 Tier, six Sleeper class, two general unreserved & two SLR (seating with luggage rake) coaches. It does not carry a pantry car.

As it is customary with most train services in India, coach composition may be amended at the discretion of Indian Railways depending on demand.

Routing
,

Traction
As the route is going to get electrified, an Erode-based WAP-4 or Royapuram-based WAP-7 electric locomotive pulls the train up to  later an Ernakulam-based WDM-3A or Golden Rock-based WDP-4D diesel locomotive pulls the train to its destination.

References

External links
16349 Rajya Rani Express at India Rail Info
16350 Rajya Rani Express at India Rail Info

Rajya Rani Express trains
Transport in Thiruvananthapuram
Rail transport in Kerala